Sarwar Sarkhosh was a singer and one of the Hazara nationalists in Afghanistan. He is the elder brother of Dawood Sarkhosh, a famous singer of the Hazara people.

Early life 
Sarwar Sarkhosh was born in 1942, in Urozgan Province (now in Daykundi Province), Afghanistan. He completed his elementary and secondary education in his home town. In the same years, with the imprisonment of his father due to ethnic prejudice against the Hazaras, the family's responsibility fell on him because he was the eldest son of his family, in this reason he was not able to continue his studies.

Death 
In 1983 he traveled from his hometown Uruzgan to Badghis and visited some Hazara people there, after returning from the trip on 1983 he was killed in a terrorist operation.

See also 
 Dawood Sarkhosh
 List of Hazara people

References

External links 
 sarwarsarkhosh.com
 soundcloud.com/azergi/Sarwar Sarkhosh

1942 births
1983 deaths
Hazara singers
Dombra players
Afghan male singers
Persian-language singers
Assassinated Afghan people
People from Urozgan Province
People from Daykundi Province
20th-century Afghan male singers